Polarr is a startup headquartered in San Jose, CA focused on enabling creators to develop their own aesthetics through visual effects sharing and discovery. Polarr currently offers applications that allow creators to express their unique visual aesthetics by making and distributing their own photo and video filters. Its flagship products include Polarr and Polarr 24FPS mobile apps for creators to create and search for trendy filters, as well as Polarr Photo Editor Online, a web-based product for pro photographers to edit photos. 

The company allegedly has the largest filter catalogue in the industry, with more than 1 million new photo and video filters generated each month from its creator community in 2022. The majority of the filters are related to evolving trends in pop culture and are ranked and searchable inside Polarr's own apps, as well as through external filter QR codes shared on social media profiles maintained by creators and influencers. Polarr is also a technology partner with cellphone OEMs such as Samsung, LG, Oppo and Lenovo, whose native camera applications are powered by Polarr's technology. Polarr is venture backed, invested by Threshold.vc, Cota Capital, Pear VC, StartX and ZhenFund.

History 
In February 2015, Polarr launched an online photo editor. It was one of the earliest in-browser photo editors capable of editing RAW images.

In June 2015, the first mobile version of Polarr Photo Editor was released.  

In the fall of 2015, Polarr released Polarr Photo Editors for Windows 10 and macOS.

Polarr was named by Apple as Best of the App Store for 2015 and 2016.

In December 2017, Polarr launched Album+, an app that organizes photos using on-device A.I.

In March 2019, Polarr announced a $11.5m Series A led by Threshold Ventures.

In June 2020, Polarr launched Polarr 6.0, a major revision of the app where the main focus became custom filter creation and distribution for creators.

In April 2022, Polarr launched the new Polarr 24FPS app where Polarr filters can be used on video.

Polarr QR Code

Polarr's brand is associated with its filter QR Code often found on social media sites. Polarr QR code is primarily used by creators to distribute filters to friends; it includes creator's social handle, a visual preview of the effect, and a scannable code for users to acquire the filter. A Polarr filter supports various photo and video effects such as color and lighting adjustments, gradient and luminance masks, custom overlays, and segmentation of identifiable objects.

References

External links

 Polarr Homepage

Photo software
Companies based in San Jose, California
Internet properties established in 2014
2014 establishments in California